Márcio Silva may refer to:

 Márcio Silva (bobsledder) (born 1980), Brazilian bobsledder
 Márcio Silva (footballer) (born 2001), Brazilian football defender

See also
 Márcio Pereira da Silva (born 1984), Brazilian football attacking midfielder
 Márcio Carioca (born 1983), born Márcio Gesteira da Silva, Brazilian football striker